Oshakati Airport  was an airport serving Oshakati in the Oshana Region of Namibia.

See also
Transport in Namibia
List of airports in Namibia

References

External links
 OurAirports - Oshakati
  Great Circle Mapper - Oshakati
 OpenStreetMap - Oshakati
 Google Earth

Airports in Namibia